William John Thomas Mitchell (born March 24, 1942) is an American academic. Mitchell is the Gaylord Donnelley Distinguished Service Professor of English and Art History at the University of Chicago. He is also the editor of Critical Inquiry, and contributes to the journal October.

His monographs, Iconology (1986) and Picture Theory (1994), focus on media theory and visual culture. He draws on ideas from Sigmund Freud and Karl Marx to demonstrate that, essentially, we must consider pictures to be living things.  His collection of essays What Do Pictures Want? (2005) won the Modern Language Association's prestigious James Russell Lowell Prize in 2005. In a recent podcast interview, Mitchell traces his interest in visual culture to his early work on William Blake, and his then burgeoning interest in developing a science of images. In that same interview, he discusses his ongoing efforts to rethink visual culture as a form of life and in light of digital media.

In 2014, Mitchell was elected to the American Philosophical Society, He was elected to the American Academy of Arts and Sciences in 2017.

Bibliography

Books
Mental Traveler: A Father, a Son, and a Journey through Schizophrenia. Chicago, IL: U of Chicago P, 2020. 
Image Science: Iconology, Visual Culture and Media Aesthetics. Chicago, IL: U of Chicago P, 2015. 
Seeing Through Race. Cambridge, MA: Harvard UP, 2012. 
Cloning Terror: The War of Images, 9/11 to the Present. Chicago, IL: U of Chicago P, 2011. 
With Mark B. N. Hansen. Critical Terms for Media Studies. Chicago, IL: U of Chicago P, 2010. 
What Do Pictures Want?: The Lives and Loves of Images. Chicago, IL: U of Chicago P, 2005. 
The Last Dinosaur Book: The Life and Times of a Cultural Icon. Chicago, IL: U of Chicago P, 1998. 
Picture Theory: Essays on Verbal and Visual Representation. Chicago: U of Chicago P, 1994. 
Iconology: Image, Text, Ideology. Chicago: U of Chicago P, 1986. pbk. 
Against Theory: Literary Studies and the New Pragmatism. Chicago: U of Chicago P, 1985. pbk. 
The Politics of Interpretation. Chicago: U of Chicago P, 1983. 
On Narrative. Chicago: U of Chicago P, 1981.  review:  from American Anthropologist
The Language of Images. Chicago: U of Chicago P, 1980. pbk. 
Blake's Composite Art: A Study of the Illuminated Poetry. Princeton: Princeton UP. 232 pp. 112 plates, 1978.

Essays and other short works
Bhabha, Homi, and W. J. T. Mitchell. "Edward Said: Continuing the Conversation." Critical Inquiry 31, no. 2 (Winter, 2005): 365–529.
Mitchell, W. J. T. "Edward Said: Continuing the Conversation." Critical Inquiry 31, no. 2 (Winter, 2005): 365–370.
"Secular Divination: Edward Said's Humanism." Critical Inquiry 31, no. 2 (Winter, 2005): 462–471.
"The Future of Criticism-A Critical Inquiry Symposium." Critical Inquiry 30, no. 2 (Winter, 2004): 324–483.
"Romanticism and the Life of Things: Fossils, Totems, and Images." in Things., Edited by Bill Brown. Chicago, IL: U of Chicago P, 2004.
"The Commitment to Form; Or, Still Crazy After all these Years." PMLA: Publications of the Modern Language Association of America 118, no. 2 (Mar, 2003): 321–325.
"Remembering Edward Said." Chronicle of Higher Education 50, no. 7 (Oct 10, 2003): B10-B11.
"The Serpent in the Wilderness: Space, Place, and Landscape in the Eighteenth Century." in Acts of Narrative., Edited by Carol Jacobs, Henry Sussman. Stanford, CA: Stanford UP, 2003.
"The Work of Art in the Age of Biocybernetic Reproduction." Modernism/Modernity 10, no. 3 (Sept, 2003): 481–500.
"Showing Seeing: A Critique of Visual Culture". In: Michael Ann Holly and Keith Moxey (eds.), Art History, Aesthetics, Visual Studies. Clark Art Institute and Yale University Press, 2002: 231–250.
"911: Criticism and Crisis." Critical Inquiry 28, no. 2 (Winter, 2002): 567–572.
"The Surplus Value of Images." Mosaic: A Journal for the Interdisciplinary Study of Literature 35, no. 3 (Sept, 2002): 1-23.
"Romanticism and the Life of Things: Fossils, Totems, and Images." Critical Inquiry 28, no. 1 (Autumn, 2001): 167–184.
"Seeing Disability." Public Culture 13, no. 3 [35] (Fall, 2001): 391–397.
"Holy Landscape: Israel, Palestine, and the American Wilderness." Critical Inquiry 26, no. 2 (Winter, 2000): 193–223.
"La Plus-Value Des Images." Etudes Littéraires 32–33, no. 3-1 (Autumn-2001 Winter, 2000): 201–225.
"The Panic of the Visual: A Conversation with Edward W. Said." in Edward Said and the Work of the Critic: Speaking Truth to Power., Edited by Paul A. Bové. Durham, NC: Duke UP, 2000.
"The Panic of the Visual: A Conversation with Edward W. Said." Boundary 2: An International Journal of Literature and Culture 25, no. 2 (Summer, 1998): 11–33.
"The Romantic Education of W. J. T. Mitchell." in U of Maryland, College Park, MD Pagination: 34 Paragraphs., Edited by Wang, Orrin N. C. (ed.), The Last Formalist,or W.J.T.Mitchell as Romantic Dinosaur1997.
"The Violence of Public Art: Do the Right Thing." in Spike Lee's do the Right Thing., Edited by Mark A. Reid. Cambridge, England: Cambridge UP, 1997.
"Chaosthetics: Blake's Sense of Form." Huntington Library Quarterly: Studies in English and American History and Literature 58, no. 3-4 (1996): 441–458.
"Visible Language: Blake's Wond'Rous Art of Writing." in William Blake., Edited by David Punter. New York: St. Martin's, 1996.
"What do Pictures really Want?" October 77, (Summer, 1996): 71–82.
"Why Comparisons are Odious." World Literature Today: A Literary Quarterly of the University of Oklahoma 70, no. 2 (Spring, 1996): 321–324.
Amrine, Frederick, Martha Banta, Antoine Compagnon, Heather Dubrow, James D. Fernández, Sue Houchins, and W. J. T. Mitchell, et al. "The Status of Evidence: A Roundtable." PMLA: Publications of the Modern Language Association of America 111, no. 1 (Jan, 1996): 21–31.
"Postcolonial Culture, Postimperial Criticism." in The Post-Colonial Studies Reader., Edited by Bill Ashcroft, Gareth Griffiths and Helen Tiffin. London: Routledge, 1995.
"Narrative, Memory, and Slavery." in Cultural Artifacts and the Production of Meaning: The Page, the Image, and the Body., Edited by Margaret J. M. Ezell, Katherine O'Brien O'Keeffe. Ann Arbor, MI: U of Michigan P, 1994.
"Ekphrasis and the Other." South Atlantic Quarterly 91, no. 3 (Summer, 1992): 695–719.
"Postcolonial Culture, Postimperial Criticism." Transition 56, (1992): 11–19.
"Iconology and Ideology: Panofsky, Althusser, and the Scene of Recognition." in Image and Ideology in Modern/Postmodern Discourse., Edited by David B. Downing, Susan Bazargan. Albany: State U of New York P, 1991.
"Against Comparison: Teaching Literature and the Visual Arts." in Teaching Literature and Other Arts., Edited by Jean-Pierre Barricelli, Joseph Gibaldi and Estella Lauter. New York: Mod. Lang. Assn. of Amer., 1990.
"Influence, Autobiography, and Literary History: Rousseau's Confessions and Wordsworth's the Prelude." ELH 57, no. 3 (Fall, 1990): 643–664.
"Essays Toward a New Art History." Critical Inquiry 15, no. 2 (Winter, 1989): 226–406.
"Image and Text in Songs." in Approaches to Teaching Blake's Songs of Innocence and of Experience., Edited by Robert F. Gleckner, Mark L. Greenberg. New York: Mod. Lang. Assn. of Amer., 1989.
"Space, Ideology, and Literary Representation." Poetics Today 10, no. 1 (Spring, 1989): 91-102.
"Tableau and Taboo: The Resistance to Vision in Literary Discourse." CEA Critic: An Official Journal of the College English Association 51, no. 1 (Fall, 1988): 4-10.
"Wittgenstein's Imagery and what it Tells Us." New Literary History: A Journal of Theory and Interpretation 19, no. 2 (Winter, 1988): 361–370.
"How Good is Nelson Goodman?" Poetics Today 7, no. 1 (1986): 111–115.
"Visible Language: Blake's Wond'Rous Art of Writing." in Romanticism and Contemporary Criticism., Edited by Morris Eaves, Michael Fischer. Ithaca: Cornell UP, 1986.
"The Politics of Genre: Space and Time in Lessing's Laocoon." Representations 6, (Spring, 1984): 98-115.
"What is an Image?" New Literary History: A Journal of Theory and Interpretation 15, no. 3 (Spring, 1984): 503–537.
"Metamorphoses of the Vortex: Hogarth, Turner, and Blake." in Articulate Images: The Sister Arts from Hogarth to Tennyson., Edited by Richard Wendorf. Minneapolis: U of Minnesota P, 1983.
"Critical Inquiry and the Ideology of Pluralism." Critical Inquiry 8, no. 4 (Summer, 1982): 609–618.
"Dangerous Blake." Studies in Romanticism 21, no. 3 (Fall, 1982): 410–416.
"How Original was Blake?" Blake: An Illustrated Quarterly 14, (-1981, 1980): 116–120.
"The Language of Images." Critical Inquiry 6, no. 3 (Spring, 1980): 359–567.
"On Narrative." Critical Inquiry 7, no. 1 (Fall, 1980): 1–236.
"Spatial Form in Literature: Toward a General Theory." Critical Inquiry: A Voice for Reasoned Inquiry into Significant Creations of the Human Spirit 6, (1980): 539–567.
"Spatial Form in Literature: Toward a General Theory." Critical Inquiry 6, no. 3 (Spring, 1980): 539–567.
"Critical Inquiry After Sheldon Sacks." Bulletin of the Midwest Modern Language Association 12, no. 1 (Spring, 1979): 32–36.
"On Sheldon Sacks." Critical Inquiry 6, no. 2 (Winter, 1979): 181–229.
"Style as Epistemology: Blake and the Movement Toward Abstraction in Romantic Art." Studies in Romanticism 16, (1977): 145–164.
Mitchell, W. J. T., and Gerald Graff. "Intellectual Politics and the Malaise of the Seventies." Salmagundi 47–48, (1980): 67–77.
Mitchell, W. J. T., and Paul Hernadi. "On Narrative."
Mitchell, W. J. T., and Winfried Menninghaus. "Angelus Novus: Perspectives on Walter Benjamin." Critical Inquiry 25, no. 2 (Winter, 1999).
Mitchell, W. J. T., Louis A. Renza, and (reply). "Going Too Far with the Sister Arts." in Space, Time, Image, Sign: Essays on Literature and the Visual Arts., Edited by James A. W. Heffernan. New York: Peter Lang, 1987.
Mitchell, W. J. T., and Gabriele Schabacher. "Der Mehrwert Von Bildern." in Die Addresse Des Mediums., Edited by Stefan Andriopoulos, Gabriele Schabacher, Eckhard Schumacher, Bernhard Dotzler, Erhard Schüttpelz and Georg Stanitzek. Cologne, Germany: DuMont, 2001.
Mitchell, W. J. T., and Nadine Strossen. "A Resounding Rock in Flight." Chronicle of Higher Education 47, no. 12 (Nov 17, 2000): B4.
Mitchell, W. J. T., and Ilse Utz. "Postkoloniale Kultur, Postimperiale Kritik." Neue Rundschau 107, no. 1 (1996): 20–25.
Mitchell, W. J. T., Orrin N. C. Wang, and (interview and gloss). "An Interview with Orrin N. C. Wang." in U of Maryland, College Park, MD Pagination: 22 Paragraphs., Edited by Wang, Orrin N. C. (ed.), The Last Formalist,or W.J.T.Mitchell as Romantic Dinosaur1997.
Surette, Leon, and W. J. T. Mitchell. "Rational Form in Literature." Critical Inquiry 7, no. 3 (Spring, 1981): 612–621.

See also
List of thinkers influenced by deconstruction

References

External links 
 W.J.T. Mitchell's Home Page

Living people
1942 births
University of Chicago faculty
Michigan State University alumni
Johns Hopkins University alumni
Place of birth missing (living people)
Academic journal editors
William Blake scholars
Fellows of the American Academy of Arts and Sciences
Corresponding Fellows of the British Academy